Anarak-e Sofla (also Romanized as Anārak-e Soflá; also known as Anārak and Anārak-e Avval) is a village in Osmanvand Rural District, Firuzabad District, Kermanshah County, Kermanshah Province, Iran. At the 2006 census, its population was 39, in 9 families.

References 

Populated places in Kermanshah County